Konstantin Papazov (better known as Titi Papazov) (Bulgarian: Константин Папазов - Тити) is a Bulgarian basketball player and current basketball coach. Titi Papazov was named "Coach of the Year of Bulgaria" in 2009.

He was born on July 17, 1967 in Sofia. He played professionally for the senior teams of Levski, Slavia and Svoge between 1986 and 1991. In 1994, Papazov was elected as president of the Slavia basketball club. The team won the Bulgarian Championship and the Bulgarian Cup in 1997. He has been the coach of the men's team "Levski" and "Academic" and the male and female national teams of Bulgaria. Papazov is married and has two sons.

Honours 
As a coach
Levski Sofia
 Bulgarian champion – 2000, 2001, 2014, 2018, 2021
 Bulgarian Cup – 2001, 2009, 2010, 2014, 2019, 2020
 Bulgarian Supercup – 2018, 2019
 Balkan League – 2010, 2014, 2018
 Coach of the Year in Bulgaria – 2009

References 

1967 births
Living people
BC Levski Sofia players
Big Brother (Bulgarian TV series) contestants
Bulgarian men's basketball players
Basketball players from Sofia